Huhtala is a Finnish surname. Notable people with the surname include:

 Harri Huhtala (born 1952), Finnish hammer thrower
 Jesse Huhtala (born 1993), Finnish ice hockey player
 Martti Huhtala (1918–2005), Finnish Nordic combined skier
 Mikko Huhtala (born 1952), Finnish wrestler
 Santtu Huhtala (born 1992), Finnish ice hockey player
 Teemu Huhtala (born 1991), Finnish ice hockey player
 Tommi Huhtala (born 1987), Finnish ice hockey player
 Väinö Huhtala (1935–2016), Finnish cross-country skier

Finnish-language surnames